The Vauxhall 30–98 is a car manufactured by Vauxhall at Luton, Bedfordshire from 1913 to 1927. In its day, its best-known configuration was the Vauxhall Velox (velox, veloc- being Latin for "swift"/"fleet" and the source of English velocity) standard 4-seater with open tourer body. Vauxhall's own description was the 30–98 hp Vauxhall-Velox sporting car. The 30–98 is also known to enthusiasts by Vauxhall's chassis code E.

In 1995 it was authoritatively described as one of Britain's best-known sports cars and in the mid-20th century reported by Automobile Quarterly to be affectionately known as the last of the Edwardians and decreed as the first and perhaps the best British sports car.

Origin

The first 30–98 was constructed at the behest of car dealer and motor sport competitor Joseph Higginson, inventor of the Autovac fuel lifter. He won the Shelsley Walsh hill-climb motoring competition on 7 June 1913 in his new Vauxhall, setting a hill record in the process, having in previous weeks made fastest time of the day at Waddington Pike and Aston Clinton. 

However they were not racing machines but fast touring cars. The exhaust made a tranquillising rumble, there was no howl, no shriek, no wail. The makers guaranteed that. Some owners had to watch their car being given the test to be reassured.

The 30-98s used the Prince Henry chassis, they were distinguished by having more-or-less flat rather than V-shaped radiators. Laurence Pomeroy took the Prince Henry L-head side-valve engine, bored it out 3 mm, then cold-stretched the crankshaft throws 5 mm using a steam power hammer to lengthen the stroke. The camshaft was given a new chain drive at the front of the engine, high lift cams and new tappet clearances. The Prince Henry chassis was slightly modified and the whole given a narrow alloy four-seater body, a pair of alloy wings (front mudguards) and no doors.

Before war intervened only 13 30-98s were made and they were for selected drivers, the last in 1915 for Percy Kidner a joint managing director (CEO) of Vauxhall.  Actual production began in 1919.

However it was found, the name 30–98 looked and sounded so well.

Specifications

Inclusive items and options supplied by the factory
When production began in 1919 an electric starter would be supplied for an extra £50 though it was standard on Vauxhall's 25 hp car. But Vauxhall made no separate charge for: electric lighting, a clock, speedometer, spare wheel and tyre, full tool kit and number plates. Customers could choose between a bonnet of plain polished aluminium or have it painted to match the rest of the car. Advertisements for the OE when introduced in 1922 noted the electric lighting now included six lamps, an instrument board lamp and gauges together with both an electric horn and a bulb horn. By 1927 the advertised equipment was limited to: bucket-shaped front seats adjustable for leg room; wire wheels and Dunlop cord tyres, two spare wheels and tyres; spring gaiters; luggage grid and windscreen wiper (singular).

Body

Velox
The Vauxhall-built Velox four-seater tourer body was the standard coachwork. Though it was light and its appearance elegant, slim and low-sided the lightness meant little comfort in the back seats and the sides were so low "rear passengers might have been warned that they were travelling at their own risk".

The 1920 catalogue included a Vauxhall Velox featherweight coupé to seat two in the interior and with chauffeur's dicky seat, electric lamp in roof and V-shaped windscreen. Though of extremely light construction the wood frame on which the metal panels are laid are contrived to give sufficient strength. The featherweight Velox coupé displayed at the (Scottish) Motor Show painted dark blue below "water line" and black above had nickel fittings and a polished aluminium bonnet and a walnut instrument panel with companion lockers. The coupé was upholstered in blue morocco leather with head lining, carpet, silk cords and laces to match. There were also blinds of a lighter blue silk with tassels. These were special body fittings for the cars in the show and not provided within the advertised price.

Wensum
There was a mid-twenties fashion for car bodies styled on the lines of motorboats. Described in its advertisement as "an ultra-sporting body" a factory-built boat-tailed open two or three-seater with flared wings called the Wensum was introduced at extra cost in 1924. The third seat really was "for decoration". Works driver, by then works manager, A J Hancock kept a fast motorboat on the River Wensum which has a popular yachting stretch near Norwich.

These bodies were not built on the same production line as the Velox.

A chassis was available for customers who wanted their own special bodies.

Engine

E
The engine was a development of the four-cylinder monobloc fixed cylinder head, push rod operated, L-head side-valve engine of the Prince Henry but enlarged to 4,525 cc by increasing the stroke from 140 to 150 mm. The new crankshaft ran in five bearings with pressure fed lubrication. A single Zenith carburettor was fitted.
 Production quantity: 274

OE
In November 1922 it was announced the engine was updated, fitted with overhead valves and detachable cylinder head and renamed OE. Low speed torque was also improved. The car and its wheelbase were lengthened four inches and widened three inches making more room for passengers and more comfortable seating.
 Production quantity: 313

Chassis
The engine was carried in a separate subframe on the ladder type chassis with semi-elliptic leaf springs, a live rear axle of orthodox design and shock absorbers front and rear. A four-speed gearbox with right hand change was fitted driving the rear wheels through a 3.08:1 straight cut bevel rear axle.

For 1923 with the OE engine the straight cut back axle gear was replaced by a spiral bevel with a higher 3.3:1 reduction ratio. The chassis and wheelbase were lengthened four inches and the chassis was also strengthened by widening the cross-section of the side rails. The body was widened three inches. Rear axle torque was now taken through a banjo-shaped torque arm alongside the propellor shaft.

Steering
Steering is by worm and complete wheel with a taper and splined drop-arm connection.

Vauxhall brakes
On 30-98s braking was a mechanical system with the pedal operating a transmission brake. The brakes on the rear wheels were controlled by a large lever (handbrake). Front-wheel brakes became available in late 1923, at first operated by Bowden double-cable but hydraulically from 1926.

Brake drums were steel with a riveted cast iron liner. On some cars the drums were finned alloy again with a riveted cast iron liner. The final batch of cars used the 23–60 components and the front drums were very large, again with fins.

The transmission brake—given a slight lead when front brakes were fitted—in a drum behind the gearbox might have been adequate but it was usually full of oil that had leaked from the rear bearing. Then pressure on the pedal just produced a bad smell. A driver with the necessary skills—good hands and an understanding of the effects of the handbrake—could corner fast. Handbrake turns were available in wet weather. "In an emergency, however, braking was a waste of time, the driver must steer, change gear, jump out or pray—perhaps in that order."

With the OE the three brake drums were switched to steel-lined aluminium drums well ribbed for cooling and linings were ferodo. In 1923 a year after the OE's introduction mechanically operated front brakes were added and linked to the pedal which still operated the transmission brake. In 1927 they were replaced by a notoriously temperamental hydraulic system from the pedal to the transmission and, again, just the front wheels.

The hydraulic system introduced in 1927. Back brakes, expanding shoes in enclosed drums, are applied by rods from the hand lever outside the body on the off-side (to the driver's right). Four-wheel brakes actuated by the pedal through a master-plunger operate on the front wheels and on (the back wheels through) the transmission just behind the gearbox. On the front wheels the brakes expand internally within big ribbed enclosed drums and on the transmission the brake contracts. Operation is hydraulic, the transmission brake by having smaller pistons receives only a third of the force. The system is self-adjusting and self-compensating. Equalisation is ensured by the sizes of the plungers. Automatic adjustment is made by the action of a friction ring fitted in a recess in the plunger of the operating system. The front brakes are operated by a quick-thread screw formed by steel balls in grooves. The leading shoe in each wheel is arranged to come on slightly earlier and to release a shade before the other.

On the off-side of the dash, under the bonnet, there is a pressurised oil reservoir maintained at about 7 lbs per sq. in. to prevent air getting into the system. A spare half-gallon of the special mixture was part of the equipment.

Suspension
The springs front and back are half elliptical. Behind they are set above the axle with swivel anchorages on the axle sleeves. The forward springs are almost flat-set and they have snubber leaves. There are shock absorbers in front and behind.

Road test opinions
"A power of acceleration, amazingly swift and smooth, yet perfectly controlled ... the thrilling characteristics of a racer in a machine tamed to behave in mannerly fashion ... the engine which gives 100 brake horse power on the bench and which will propel the car at over 80 miles an hour on the level can be throttled down until the vehicle is running smoothly at 12–15 miles an hour." "It is certainly the greediest motor of the touring type that I have driven. I do not mean in petrol but in a straining desire to be allowed to go ever faster."

(OE) "A rapid double-clutch at 50 or even over can be made without a sound, and away she romps with a slight bark of joy on third ... The price of the 30–98, so demurely described in the catalogue as a fast touring car, is £1,220".

Some people feel it is a mistake to compare a 30–98 with a Bentley.

Owner's opinion
"in spite of my eighteen years experience, I only began to motor in reality since I purchased my 30–98." Quoted by writer Beverly R Kimes in Automobile Quarterly.

Pricing

Chassis only
 1919 £1,125
 1920 £1,275
 1921 £950 reduced following the slump in demand for all cars
 1924 £950
With the Velox body:
 1919 £1,475
 1920 £1,676
 1921 £1,300 reduced following the slump in demand for all cars
 1924 £1,220
When Rolls-Royce announced their new 20 hp car (30–98 rated at 23.8 hp) in December 1922 its prices were:
 chassis only £1100
 with the most popular (open tourer) body total cost was around £1600
The first General Motors Vauxhall Cadet, a 4-door 2-litre 6-cylinder saloon, was priced at £280 in 1930, up to a decade later.

Motor sport

By 1920 the 30–98 had built itself an enduring reputation in racing as well as on the road. Later, with the OE engine, Vauxhall would guarantee that a car stripped down for competition would be able to attain a top speed of 100 mph (160 km/h)

After the war 30-98s were never raced by the factory, which had no significant competition department, but they were campaigned successfully by private owners. Rather than following the frequent pre-1914 pattern of ever larger engines for competition results, its success depended less on brute strength (size of engine—and that was always 4 cylinders) and more on overall excellence of design and sturdiness of construction.

Final production run
They also had a closer ratio gearbox.

Notes

References

External links

Centenary commemorations
 Waddington Fell 2013, not "in a series of alarming slides"
 Shelsley Walsh 2013, fuzzy with selfie and added wireless
 Lakeland Trial 2011

30-98
Roadsters
Cars introduced in 1913
1920s cars
Sports racing cars
Rear-wheel-drive vehicles